Nicholas John Preston (born 5 April 1958) is a British former rugby union international who represented the England in three Test matches.

Preston, a Lancashire-born centre, made his Test debut against the All Blacks at Twickenham in 1979. His other two Test appearances came during England's successful 1980 Five Nations Championship campaign, in which they achieved their first Grand Slam since 1957. This included the team's win over France at Parc des Princes, where he scored one of England's two tries. At club level he competed for Richmond F.C. in London.

See also
List of England national rugby union players

References

External links

1958 births
Living people
English rugby union players
England international rugby union players
Rugby union players from Lancashire
Richmond F.C. players
Rugby union centres
Sportspeople from Prestwich